Rachel Wilde (born Rachel Wilson) is a British actress who played Nikki Spraggan in the BBC soap opera EastEnders.

References

External links
 

Living people
English soap opera actresses
Year of birth missing (living people)